The 2010 Jackson State Tigers football team represented Jackson State University as a member of the East Division of the Southwestern Athletic Conference (SWAC) during the 2010 NCAA Division I FCS football season.

Schedule

References

Jackson State
Jackson State Tigers football seasons
Jackson State Tigers football